

History
Felling Male Voice Choir was established in 1920 and is based in Felling, Gateshead, in the North East of England. The choir performs throughout the region and also undertakes national and international tours, and has won several major awards.

The choir has its roots in the Methodist Church and promotes male voice singing by developing an increasingly wide repertoire. With music from Palestrina to modern classics.

In 2010 the choir celebrated its 90th year in a joint concert with the Reg Vardy Band.

Notable concerts
October 2008: Celebrity Concert with Sir Thomas Allen (at Sage Gateshead)

Competition successes
The choir has the unique honour of winning the choral competition at the 1951 Festival of Britain.

The choir today
FMVC has a membership of around 80 members, ranging in age from 20s upwards.  Their current director of music is Mark Edwards.

Repertoire
The Long Day Closes
The Caller
Cullercoats Bay
I'm Gonna Sing

Discography
Ain't Got Time to Die (1973)
Home and Away
Rejoice with Felling
Voices of the Tyne (1981)
Voices of the North
Chart Toppers (2006)
Keep Your Feet Still Geordie Hinny! (2006)
Christmas with Felling (2010)

Alumni

References

External links
Felling Male Voice Choir website
FMVC on Youtube: photographic montage set to a sample FMVC music excerpts.
BBC News story: performed for Queen Elizabeth during a visit to Sunderland.
The National Archives stores records of the Felling Male Voice Choir from 1921-95.
Performed the national anthem for Queen Elizabeth at the opening of the Gateshead Millennium Bridge.
"Men of Felling", a piece dedicated to the Choir by composer Alan Bush.
Article on Alan Bush in journal The Musical Times, references "Men of Felling".
Entry for "Men of Felling" at the Alan Bush Music Trust.
Catalogue of Records at the Tyne and Wear Archives Service.

BBC News article on a piece of public art incorporating recordings of the Choir.
Northern Echo Article on For Saturday 10th Niv 2007 concert, at St Oswald's Church, Durham City

English choirs
Music in Tyne and Wear
Boys' and men's choirs
Musical groups established in 1920